Russell Craig Gary (July 31, 1959 – March 10, 2019) was an American football defensive back in the National Football League for the New Orleans Saints and the Philadelphia Eagles.  He played college football at the University of Nebraska.  In 1983, Gary was voted First-team All Pro for the NFL.  Russell also worked under head coacher Shannon Currier coaching the defensive backs at Concordia University, St. Paul.

References

1959 births
2019 deaths
Players of American football from Minneapolis
Nebraska Cornhuskers football players
American football defensive backs
New Orleans Saints players
Philadelphia Eagles players